Millie Tomlinson (born 27 April 1992 in Derby) is a professional squash player who represents England. She reached a career-high world ranking of World No. 20 in July 2019. She has won 14 PSA tour titles in her career to date.

She went to Yale University and she played on the Varsity Squash Team. During her tenure at Yale, the team won he National Squash Championships.

References

External links 

English female squash players
Living people
1992 births
Competitors at the 2017 World Games